The 6th Macondo Awards ceremony, presented by the Colombian Academy of Cinematography Arts and Sciences, honored the best audiovisual productions of 2017. It took place on December 12, 2017, at the Faenza Theatre in Bogotá. The ceremony awarded 16 categories and was broadcast by Señal Colombia.

The film Guilty Men won the award for Best Film.

Winners and nominees

See also

 List of Colombian films
 Macondo Awards
 2017 in film

References

External links
6th Macondo Awards at IMDb
6th Macondo Awards at Filmaffinity

2017 film awards
2017 in Colombia
Events in Bogotá
Culture in Bogotá